The Dennis L. Edwards Tunnel is a highway tunnel in northwestern Oregon that carries the Sunset Highway (U.S. Route 26) through the Northern Oregon Coast Range mountains near the unincorporated community of Manning,  west of Portland.

The tunnel was originally known as the Sunset Tunnel until 2002. It was renamed in honor of Dennis L. Edwards, an Oregon Department of Transportation worker who was killed on January 28, 1999 when part of the tunnel collapsed while he was inspecting it for damage caused by heavy rains. The tunnel was closed for five weeks for repairs, and renamed for Edwards three years later.

See also
 List of tunnels in the United States
 List of tunnels by location

References

Road tunnels in Oregon
Transportation buildings and structures in Washington County, Oregon
Tunnels completed in 1940
1940 establishments in Oregon
U.S. Route 26